Jamel Bousbaa (born 15 November 1990), known professionally as Potter Payper, is a British rapper and songwriter from Barking, London. In 2021, he signed to the UK division of Def Jam Recordings. In 2022, "Gangsteritus" - recorded with Tiggs Da Author - became his first UK Top 40 single after its use in Top Boy.

Early life
Jamel Bousbaa was born to an Irish mother and an Algerian father. He grew up on the Gascoigne Estate in Barking, London being raised by his grandmother.

Personal life 
On August 13 2015 Potter Payper was arrested during the execution of a warrant at an address in Clacton, Essex, following an investigation into the "Frankie" county drug line, which resulted in charges of; one count of possession with intent to supply a class A drug and one count of conspiring to supply a class A drug. He was jailed for five years and four months. He was released in June 2020.

Discography

Mixtapes

Extended plays

Singles

References

English male rappers
Rappers from London
People from Barking, London
People from the London Borough of Barking and Dagenham
Living people
1990 births
English people of Irish descent
English people of Algerian descent
Gangsta rappers
21st-century British rappers
21st-century British male musicians